MOLMED is a biotechnology company founded in 1996 in Milan.  It originally operated as contract manufacturing organization and other services for companies developing gene therapy and cell therapy products. In 2000, the company changed its business model and started to develop products of its own. 

In 2001, it signed an agreement with San Raffaele Hospital, that gave MolMed an option to license any gene therapy or cell therapy invention made at the hospital in the fields of cancer and HIV.

The company was listed on the Milan Stock Exchange in 2008.

In early 2015, MolMed partnered with GlaxoSmithKline related to GSK's acquisition of Strimvelis; MolMed had been involved in the early development of the product. In March 2020 Fininvest, the reference shareholder with 23.13%, announced its intention to participate in the total takeover bid of the Japanese Agc (Mitsubishi) at the price of 0.518 euros per share, with a 110% premium compared to the price recorded in the session of the previous day (0.24 euro).

References

External links
 Official website

Companies established in 1996